The 2015 season was the San Francisco 49ers' 66th in the National Football League, the 70th overall, second playing their home games at Levi's Stadium, and the only season under head coach Jim Tomsula. They were attempting to make history as the first Super Bowl host team to play the Super Bowl on their own home field, but they failed to improve on their 8–8 record from 2014, and ended with a 5–11 record to miss the playoffs for the second season in a row and finish with a losing record for the first time since 2010. They also finished last in the NFC West for the first time in a decade, and marked the 31st consecutive year in which the Super Bowl did not include the team in whose region the game was being played – a feat that never has been achieved since themselves in 1984.

This for first time since 2004 when Frank Gore was not on the opening day roster.

Offseason

Coaching changes
With their loss to the Seattle Seahawks in Week 15 of the 2014–15 season, the 49ers were mathematically eliminated from the postseason, exacerbating tensions between head coach Jim Harbaugh and general manager Trent Baalke. After the season ended, the 49ers and Harbaugh mutually agreed to end his contract. On January 14, 2015, Jim Tomsula was promoted to head coach after serving as defensive line coach with the team since 2007; it was his second time at the helm, as he previously served as the 49ers' interim head coach for one game, after Mike Singletary's firing in 2010.

Roster changes

Free Agency

Signings

Departures

2015 NFL Draft

Notes
 The 49ers traded their first-round selection (No. 15 overall) to the San Diego Chargers in exchange for San Diego's first- and fourth-round selection (Nos. 17 and 117 overall, respectively) as well a fifth-round selection in 2016.
 The 49ers acquired an additional fourth-round selection as part of a trade that sent their 2014 second- and seventh-round selections to the Denver Broncos.
 The 49ers traded a seventh-round selection to the Miami Dolphins in exchange for offensive tackle Jonathan Martin.
 The 49ers acquired an additional seventh-round selection in a trade that sent linebacker Cam Johnson to the Indianapolis Colts.
 The 49ers traded their fifth-round selection (No. 151 overall) to the Indianapolis Colts in exchange for Indianapolis's fifth- and seventh-round selection (Nos. 165 and 244 overall, respectively).
 The 49ers acquired a sixth-round selection in 2016 as part of a trade that sent their seventh-round selections (No. 246) to Dallas Cowboys.

Undrafted free agents

Staff

Final roster

Schedule

Preseason

Regular season

Game summaries

Week 1: vs. Minnesota Vikings

In the 49ers' first game with new head coach Jim Tomsula, the 49ers defeated the Minnesota Vikings 20–3 on Monday Night Football. In his first career start, Carlos Hyde rushed 26 times for 168 yards and two touchdowns. Hyde's 168 rushing yards were the most by a 49ers player since 2012, when Colin Kaepernick rushed for 181 against the Packers. Colin Kaepernick went 17 for 26 with 165 yards passing. The 49ers defense was stout, holding the Vikings to just three points and sacking Vikings quarterback Teddy Bridgewater five times. Adrian Peterson, returning from suspension, rushed for only 31 yards on 10 carries. This game also marked the return of NaVorro Bowman, who missed all of the 2014 season with an injury. He had seven tackles and a sack in the season opener. In addition, the 49ers introduced black alternate uniforms.

Week 2: at Pittsburgh Steelers

The 49ers' first road game of the year ended in a disaster. The 49ers defense had no answer for Ben Roethlisberger, who went 21 for 27,369 yards and three touchdown passes as the Steelers won 43–18. The Steelers took a commanding 29-3 halftime lead. Despite only scoring 18 points, the 49ers offense opened up in the second half, with Kaepernick leading the 49ers into the Steelers red zone four times, but only able to score one touchdown (along with a field goal and two turnovers on downs). The highlight for the 49ers was Kaepernick hitting wide receiver Torrey Smith for a 75-yard touchdown pass in the fourth quarter. The Steelers defense had a field day on Kaepernick, sacking him 5 times and making him lose a fumble.

With the loss, the 49ers fell to 1-1.

Week 3: at Arizona Cardinals

49ers quarterback Colin Kaepernick became the first player since 1925 to throw two interceptions returned for touchdowns (pick sixes) to start a game. He had four interceptions in the game overall and the Cardinals thrashed the 49ers 47–7. This is the most points the Cardinals have ever scored against the 49ers. In the past two weeks, the 49ers were outscored 90–25.

With the loss, the 49ers dropped to 1–2.

Week 4: vs. Green Bay Packers

Despite a good showing by the 49ers defense (holding the Packers to a season-low 17 points and sacking Aaron Rodgers 3 times), the 49ers offense struggled all game. It was another frustrating day for Colin Kaepernick, who consistently missed receivers and threw an interception. Throughout the game, he was sacked six times. In the last two weeks, Kaepernick had no touchdown passes and five interceptions with a quarterback rating of 12.7.

With yet another tough loss, the 49ers dropped to 1–3, and were outscored by a total of 110–48 in their first 4 games. By the end of week 4, the 49ers were last in the league in total points scored.

Week 5: at New York Giants

In one of the wildest games of the year, the 49ers lost a heartbreaker in the final minute. The 49ers offense, which struggled the previous two weeks and had just 6 points at halftime in this game, came alive and scored three-second half touchdowns, including Carlos Hyde's 2-yard go-ahead touchdown run with 1:45 left on the clock to give the 49ers a 27–23 lead. But Giants quarterback Eli Manning led the Giants down the field and threw a 12-yard touchdown to Larry Donnell with 0:17 left in the game. The 49ers defense was shredded for an astonishing 525 yards by the Giants offense. There were five lead changes in the game, three of them in the final 4:29 of the fourth quarter.

With the loss, the 49ers fell to 1–4.

Week 6: vs. Baltimore Ravens

The 49ers met the Ravens for the first time since Super Bowl XLVII, in which the Ravens won 34–31. In the second quarter, Colin Kaepernick threw a 76-yard pass to ex-Raven Torrey Smith to extend San Francisco's lead to 13–3. In the fourth quarter, Kaepernick threw another touchdown, this time to Quinton Patton, for 11 yards to lead the 49ers 25–13. This was Patton's first NFL touchdown. With the win, the 49ers avenged their Super Bowl loss and broke their 4-game losing streak, and they improved to 2–4.

Week 7: vs. Seattle Seahawks

Much like last year's Thanksgiving Day matchup, the 49ers were unable to stop the defending NFC Champion Seattle Seahawks. Colin Kaepernick struggled all game long and he was sacked six times, much like Week 4 against Green Bay, where the 49ers were also only held to a field goal. With the 20–3 loss, the 49ers dropped to 2–5.

Week 8: at St. Louis Rams

With the loss, San Francisco fell to 2–6.

Week 9: vs. Atlanta Falcons

This was Blaine Gabbert's first game as starting quarterback with the 49ers, replacing Colin Kaepernick. The 49ers were also without tight end Vernon Davis, who was traded to the Denver Broncos, after nine and a half seasons with the team.

With the win, the 49ers improved to 3–6.

Week 11: at Seattle Seahawks

Blaine Gabbert made his second start and remained starter for the rest of the season with Colin Kaepernick undergoing season-ending surgery on his left non-throwing shoulder.

After the loss, the 49ers fell to 3–7.

Week 12: vs. Arizona Cardinals

With the loss, the 49ers fell to 3-8 and were swept by the Cardinals for the first time since 2008.

Week 13: at Chicago Bears
The 49ers would trail 20–13 with less than a minute to go. Blaine Gabbert would run in a game-tying 44-yard touchdown to tie the game at 20. However, the Bears appeared to have the game won when they went down the field after a 74-yard kick return by Deonte Thompson. But when Robbie Gould came out to attempt a game-winning 36-yard field goal, the kick was wide left, resulting in overtime. In the overtime period, Gabbert would throw the game-winning 71-yard touchdown pass to Torrey Smith to win the game for San Francisco. This was San Francisco's first win in Chicago since the 1988 NFC Championship Game.

With the win, the 49ers went to 4–8.

Week 14: at Cleveland Browns

With the loss, the 49ers were eliminated from the playoffs and became the latest Super Bowl host team to fail to play the championship game on its own home field.

Week 15: vs. Cincinnati Bengals

The 49ers played an overall ugly game as they lost 24–14 to the powerful Cincinnati Bengals. Quarterback Blaine Gabbert threw 3 interceptions and receiver Anquan Boldin lost a fumble.

With the loss, the 49ers fell to 4–10.

Week 16: at Detroit Lions

With the loss, the 49ers fell to 4–11.

Week 17: vs. St. Louis Rams

This was the final game between the San Francisco 49ers and the St. Louis Rams before the Rams' relocation to Los Angeles. With the win, the 49ers ended their season 5–11.

Standings

Division

Conference

Notes

References

External links
 
 

San Francisco
San Francisco 49ers seasons
San Francisco 49ers
2015 in San Francisco